Postiglione is a town and comune in the province of Salerno in the Campania region of south-western Italy.

Geography
Located in Cilento, below the Alburni mountains, borders with the municipalities of Altavilla Silentina, Campagna, Castelcivita, Controne, Contursi Terme, Serre and Sicignano degli Alburni.

Postiglione counts 5 frazioni: Canneto, Duchessa, Selvanera, Terzo di Mezzo and Zancuso. Canneto, located on the road between Postiglione and Controne, is the most populated one.

References

External links

Cities and towns in Campania
Localities of Cilento